Ihor Serhiyovych Vasylyev Ukrainian politician. In 2019, he was elected for the Servant of the People in the 9th Ukrainian Verkhovna Rada.

Born in Poltava, Ukraine, Vasylyev graduated from the Ukrainian Academy of Banking (“Banking”), Kyiv University. In 2019, he was a member of the Verkhovna Rada Committee on Digital Transformation.

Candidate for people's deputies in the party “Servant of the People” at the parliamentary elections of 2019 (electoral constituency No. 158, part of the Zarichny district in Sumy, Bilopilsky, Krasnopilsky, Sumy districts).

References 

1984 births
Living people
Politicians from Poltava
Ninth convocation members of the Verkhovna Rada
Servant of the People (political party) politicians